Hamastan is a pejorative neologism, merging 'Hamas', a Palestinian militant organization and political party, and '-stan', a suffix of Persian origin meaning "home of/place of". The term Hamastan generally relates to the Hamas administration of the Gaza Strip.

The term emerged during the days of Israel's withdrawal from the Gaza Strip in 2005, and is suggestive of either Bantustans (the nominally self-governing black homelands created in apartheid-era South Africa; see Palestinian enclaves), or Hamas' Islamist ideology (rhetorically likened to the Taliban's rule of Afghanistan) or, alternatively, political ties with Iran.

Linguistic history
Since 2007, the term has been used to refer to Hamas' 2007 victory in Gaza over Fatah in the inter-Palestinian conflict.

After Hamas' victory in the Palestinian legislative election of 2006 further heightened Western fears of an emerging Islamic fundamentalist state in the Palestinian territories, and various Israeli politicians, including Likud chairman Benjamin Netanyahu (on January 26, 2006, at a live IBA broadcast) increasingly employed the term disparagingly in the run up to the Israeli elections to berate Ehud Olmert.

With the Hamas takeover of the Gaza Strip, the creation of an Islamic mini-state in Gaza has been described by many commentators as "Hamastan" or "Hamas-stan".

Originally, the suffix 'Stan' (land) is from the Persian language, not Arabic, and in general, it is not used in the names of Arab countries.  The Arabic-alphabet spelling حماستان is used, though "Hamastan" was not created according to usual patterns of Arabic-language word formation, and is not really Arabic as such.

In this context the Fatah-controlled West Bank has sometimes analogously been called "Fatahland," a revival of a term originally used in the 1970s to refer to Southern Lebanon.

See also
 Fatahland
 Gaza Strip
 Media coverage of the Arab–Israeli conflict
 Islamism in the Gaza Strip
 Hamas Covenant – the founding principles of Hamas

References

External links

Hamas
Gaza–Israel conflict
Political slurs
2000s neologisms
Political terminology in Israel

de:Gazastreifen#2006–2007